Thirst is an Australian desert drama written and directed by Robert Carter, and starring Victoria Haralabidou, Myles Pollard, Hanna Mangan-Lawrence and Tom Green. Thirst is about four individuals who become stranded in the desert with limited water, and are forced to make choices that challenge their ideas of themselves and what they truly need.

Plot 
Set in 2017, four people isolated in their different ways, are trapped, with little water, in the desert outback of Australia. Against impossible odds
can they find meaning, connection, laughter... even love before it is too late?
 
Kit, a beautiful 18-year-old, fostered since birth, goes on the run with 17-year-old Zac, the son of her foster family following a near fatal shooting. 
They head for the desert where Kit remembers seeing on television abandoned mining huts where they could take refuge.
 
In the desert, living in just such a hut, a woman, Minna searches for something mysterious, digging deep holes everywhere. When a mining company employee, 
Boyce, arrives from head office to take Minna back to the city, several days drive away, she refuses to go. A violent struggle ensues
and the two become stranded with no way back. 

Kit and Zac, out of petrol, arrive and the four are reluctantly thrust together to survive.
 
Boyce, a wise-cracking, failed comedian; Minna, intelligent scientist, obsessively searching for something mysterious; 
Kit, drop-dead gorgeous, believing she cannot love; Zac, crazy for Kit but with no idea how to connect.
 
Isolated in their different ways, the four are forced to make choices that challenge their ideas of themselves, expose their true needs, 
and offer the chance to live a whole life in a day.

Cast 
 Victoria Haralabidou as Minna
 Myles Pollard as Boyce
 Hanna Mangan-Lawrence as Kit
 Tom Green as Zac

Directors Statement 
Only when there is no future does the possibility exist to live fully in the moment. With no reason to hold onto the past nor save ourselves for future possibilities, 
we are free to see what is left of the day, to expose ourselves, to face unwanted truths, and to take the biggest risk of all – to open to our own capacity to love.

Thirst brings together four people isolated and alone in four different ways and traps them in the desert with little water and no means of escape. How will they react?  
What will they do? How will they make sense of their lives? What will become important? Can they find meaning – something larger than themselves?

Carl Jung said that most of the unhappy people who came to see him suffered not from some clinical illness but from the meaningless and emptiness of their lives. 
For me, Thirst is about forcing to the surface deeply protected and vulnerable human needs and exposing them to light and life.

Minna, sensitive, scientific searches in the desert for a rare type of meteorite.

"I want to touch something that comes from somewhere impossible."

Overwhelmed by people in the cities, finding them illogical, confusing and disappointing, Minna has abandoned the possibility of happiness with people 
long ago – or has she?

Boyce, sent by the mining company to bring Minna back from the desert, desperately wanting to be a successful comedian, holds on to his failure 
like protective armour rather than risk more failure by connecting with anyone. 

"There's something missing from everyone I ever met"

Boyce makes a joke of his life and the lives of those around him. Yet strangely, like literature's wise fool, has a wisdom that touches everyone.

Kit, a damaged 17-year-old, fostered since birth by a mother who failed to love her, believes that something is missing from her, which means 
she can never love anyone. 

"No matter how hard you try, you can never see the face that you're kissing."

Reckless, overenthusiastic, believing everyone eventually leaves, Kit has little fear
of dying in the desert.

Zac, raised in a home with narcissistic parents, runs from having shot and wounded his father. Cynical and angry, deeply in love with Kit, 
Zac knows he has no chance of having that love returned.

"Words are how we change the truth."

Because of his love, Zac is confronted with the worst of all possible choices.

Themes 
The film asks several questions and proposes some unlikely answers.
– Is 'meaning' found, or is it constructed?
– What is the most significant thing we can do?
– What is the antidote to a fear of death?
– Do the things that make us successful: position, pride, fear of failure, protective defences, keep us from the vulnerability required to experience great love?

The desert is intended as a metaphor for the barren internal lives suggested by Jung’s patients. The constantly moving camera deliberately echoes time passing relentlessly, 
smoothly, constantly so we are always aware that it is moving towards a resolution no matter how lifeless and static the desert may appear. 

Set in the not too distant future, Thirst also gently suggests a changing planet, affected by climate change, forest degradation, and limited resources. 
The personal defences and denials of the characters, echo the responses of the wider population to looming truths.

Does life become more precious, more terrifying, when you can count the remaining days on your left hand?  Surprisingly, against reason, our characters 
appear to become more alive – perhaps happier, definitely more connected, as time runs out. How can this be? The answer, embedded in the DNA of the film, 
lies in the choices they make, suggesting a way to live – a way towards meaning, a way to connect as time runs out for all of us.

Production 
Thirst was filmed in outback NSW around Broken Hill.

References 
 ABC At The Movies Reviewed 21 March 2012
 Thirst on iTunes
 Robert Carter: Metaphor Man and a Plague of moths Screenhub

External links
 Official web site
 
 Thirst at Rotten Tomatoes
 Thirst at AllRovi

Films set in 2017
2012 drama films
Australian drama films
Films set in deserts
Films shot in Australia
Films set in Australia
Films set in the future